House of Secrets is a 1936 American mystery thriller film directed by Roland D. Reed and starring Leslie Fenton, Muriel Evans and Noel Madison. It is based on the 1926 British novel The House of Secrets by Sydney Horler, which Chesterfield Pictures had previously made into a 1929 film The House of Secrets.

Plot summary
The film opens on a ship where Barry Wilding and Julie Kenmore meet on their way to England. Upon reaching there, Barry learns that he has inherited a house that belonged to his ancestors. To see how it looks, he goes there one night but finds that it has been occupied by an old man and his daughter, the same girl he met on the ship. The mystery deepens when he discovers that suspicious people are after the house and strange things are happening.

Cast
Leslie Fenton as Barry Wilding
Muriel Evans as Julie Kenmore
Noel Madison as Dan Wharton
Sidney Blackmer as Tom Starr
Morgan Wallace as Dr. Kenmore
Holmes Herbert as Sir Bertram Evans
Ian Maclaren as Commissioner Cross
Jameson Thomas as Coventry
Syd Saylor as Ed
Matty Fain as Jumpy
George Rosener as Hector Munson
Matty Kemp as Man on Ship

See also
The House of Secrets (1929)

External links

1936 films
1936 crime films
American mystery films
1930s English-language films
American black-and-white films
Films set in London
Chesterfield Pictures films
Remakes of American films
1936 mystery films
American crime films
Films based on British novels
Films directed by Roland D. Reed
1930s American films